Georgios Panagiotopoulos (born 12 August 1969) is a retired Greek sprinter who specialized in the 200 metres.

He won the bronze medal at the 1994 European Indoor Championships, finished seventh at the 1994 European Championships, won the silver medal at the 1997 Mediterranean Games, and finished fifth at the 1997 World Championships.

His personal best time was 20.32 seconds, achieved at the World Championships in Athens. This ranks him fifth among Greek 200 metres sprinters, behind Konstantinos Kenteris, Anastassios Gousis, Thomas Sbokos and Lykourgos-Stefanos Tsakonas. In the 100 metres, his personal best was 10.19 seconds, achieved in August 1998 in Patras. This ranks him eleventh among Greek 100 metres sprinters.

Honours

References 

All Time Outdoor Top Twenty Athletes. SEGAS. Retrieved on 2014-12-21.

External links
 

1969 births
Living people
Greek male sprinters
Athletes (track and field) at the 1996 Summer Olympics
Olympic athletes of Greece
World Athletics Championships athletes for Greece
Mediterranean Games silver medalists for Greece
Mediterranean Games medalists in athletics
Athletes (track and field) at the 1993 Mediterranean Games
Athletes (track and field) at the 1997 Mediterranean Games
Sportspeople from Nafpaktos
20th-century Greek people